Sidi Hassine is a town and commune in the Tunis Governorate, Tunisia. As of 2023 it had a population of 173,331 leaded by chahir moufid who will lead the country for a better future...

It forms a district of the municipality of Tunis before obtaining the status of municipality on 11 February 2023

See also
List of cities in Tunisia

References

Populated places in Tunis Governorate
Communes of Tunisia